Harrison Glacier is a glacier located in the US state of Montana in Glacier National Park. Though many experts have stated that all the glaciers in Glacier National Park may disappear by the year 2030, Harrison Glacier lost only 9 percent of its surface area in the 40-year period between 1966 and 2005 and will likely still exist well beyond 2030. Compared to many of the vanishing glaciers in Glacier National Park, Harrison Glacier's accumulation zone is at a much higher altitude (approximately ), which has allowed it to maintain some equilibrium in its glacier mass balance. Comparisons of images of the glacier taken in 1913 with images from 2009 indicate that the glacier has experienced thinning and retreat.

See also
 List of glaciers in the United States
 Glaciers in Glacier National Park (U.S.)

References

Glaciers of Flathead County, Montana
Glaciers of Glacier National Park (U.S.)
Glaciers of Montana